Pogonocephala is a genus of moths in the family Gracillariidae.

Species
Pogonocephala heteropsis (Lower, 1894)  
Pogonocephala veneranda (Meyrick, 1909)

External links
Global Taxonomic Database of Gracillariidae (Lepidoptera)

Gracillariinae
Gracillarioidea genera